PLDT, Inc., formerly known as the Philippine Long Distance Telephone Company, is a Philippine telecommunications, internet and digital service holdings company. It is one of the country's major telecommunications providers, along with Globe Telecom and startup Dito Telecommunity. Founded in 1928, it is the oldest and largest telecommunications company in the Philippines, in terms of assets and revenues.

The company's core businesses are fixed-line telecommunications, mobile telephony services, broadband, and internet of things services under various brands. It also has investments in broadcasting, print media, utilities, and direct-to-home satellite services, among others. As of 2019, PLDT is listed in the Philippine Stock Exchange and New York Stock Exchange (the only Philippine company to be listed in NYSE) and is being controlled by First Pacific, a Hong Kong-based investment management company; Nippon Telegraph and Telephone, through its subsidiaries; and JG Summit, a major conglomerate that operates the airline Cebu Pacific, food manufacturer Universal Robina, and real estate firm Robinsons Land.

Throughout the past decades, PLDT has received numerous complaints from the Philippine House of Representatives and Senate regarding slow internet connection.

History

GTE era
PLDT was established on November 18, 1928, by a Philippine Government act. Philippine legislature and approved by then governor-general Henry L. Stimson by means of a merger of four telephone companies under operation of the American telephone company GTE. Known as Act 3436, the bill granted PLDT a 50-year charter and the right to establish a Philippine telephone network linking major points nationwide. However, PLDT had to meet a 40-day deadline to start implementing the network, which would be implemented over a period of one to four years.

By the 1930s, PLDT had an expansive fixed-line network and for the first time linked the Philippines to the outside world via radiotelephone services, connecting the Philippines to the United States and other parts of the world.

Telephone service in the Philippines was interrupted due to World War II. At the end of the war, the Philippines' communications infrastructure was in ruins. U.S. military authorities eventually handed over the remains of the communications infrastructure to PLDT in 1947, and with the help of massive U.S. aid to the Philippines during the 1940s and 1950s, PLDT recovered so quickly that its telephone subscribers outpaced that of pre-war levels by 1953.

Ramon Cojuangco Era
On December 20, 1967, a group of Filipino entrepreneurs and businessmen led by Ramon Cojuangco took control of PLDT after buying its shares from the American telecommunications company GTE. The group took control of PLDT's management on January 1, 1968, with the election of Gregorio S. Licaros and Cojuangco as chairman and president of PLDT, respectively. A few months later, PLDT's main office in Makati (known today as the Ramon Cojuangco Building) was opened, and PLDT's expansion programs begin, hoping to bring reliable telephone services to the rural areas. It was also during that time that PLDT was able to use Intelsat II F-4 communications satellite to beam international events such as the Apollo 8 mission and the funeral of Robert F. Kennedy in 1968.

Martial Law 
PLDT was permitted to operate during Martial Law. During the 1970s, PLDT was nationalized by the government of then-president Ferdinand Marcos and in 1981, in compliance of then existing policy of the Philippine government to integrate the Philippine telecommunications industry, purchased substantially all of the assets and liabilities of Republic Telephone Company, becoming the country's telephone monopoly. Under this monopoly, service expansion were severely curtailed or practically nonexistent. In the Martial Law years people would apply for phone service only to wait for years and years on end behind an impossibly long application backlog. It is not unheard of for people and small businesses back then to barter for a single telephone line in the black market for tens of thousands of pesos. The incumbent Singaporean Prime Minister Lee Kuan Yew referred to the situation when visiting the Philippines during the term of President Fidel V. Ramos. He said, albeit in jest, “In the Philippines, 95% of the population has no telephone, while the remaining 5% are waiting for that dial tone.”

Tonyboy Cojuangco Era
After President Marcos was overthrown in 1986, the company was re-privatized and Cojuangco's son, Antonio "Tonyboy" O. Cojuangco, Jr. became chief executive. On March 16, 1988, PLDT launched the country's first cellular phone system in Sampaloc, Manila to enable the public use of mobile phones. By 1995, with the passage of the Telecommunications Act and the subsequent deregulation of the Philippine telecommunications industry, the company has been de-monopolized.

In 1992, PLDT partnered with AT&T Corporation to expand its services into rural communities; including USA Direct Roving Van Service, a mobile van equipped with cellular phones, to provide toll service to some previously unserved rural communities; point-to-point international digital leased line service; payphone services; and magnetic prepaid telephone cards. By 1997, the company, through Mabuhay Satellite Corporation, launched the Philippines' first local communications satellite, Agila II (It was later divested to Asia Broadcast Satellite in 2009).

First Pacific Era

In 1998, Hong Kong-based First Pacific Company Ltd. acquired a 17.5% controlling stake in PLDT for approximately P29.7 billion. Following the acquisition by the First Pacific group, Manuel V. Pangilinan became the new president and CEO of PLDT, replacing Cojuangco, who assumed the post of chairman until 2004. An additional investment was added in 2000 through a share-swap agreement; where NTT Communications, a subsidiary of Nippon Telegraph and Telephone, acquired a share in PLDT in exchange for its co-owned wireless telecom company Smart Communications.

PLDT acquired 51.55% of the shares of Digital Telecommunications Philippines from JG Summit Holdings in March 2011 with the cost of ₱69.2 Billion. Because of this, the shares of Digitel and JG Summit in the PSE surges while PLDT's shares remained unchanged. In the deal, JG Summit will have a 12% share in PLDT. It was finalized by the National Telecommunications Commission on October 26, 2011. In exchange of the transaction, PLDT's subsidiary Smart Communications surrendered the mobile frequency and spectrum being used by its service Red Mobile to the government, which was finalized in 2016.

In April 2016, the company, then known as the Philippine Long Distance Telephone Company, dropped the "long distance telephone" from its corporate name and was renamed PLDT Inc.  Its board of directors approved the new corporate name to reflect on the company's new range of services, mainly focusing on data services. On June 13, 2016, PLDT and its subsidiary Smart unveiled their new logos and identity as part of the company's continuing digital pivot.

Operations

Fixed Line
PLDT's fixed line business offers services intended for enterprises, small and medium enterprises, and corporate consumers – including corporate data, ICT solutions, data networking, and cybersecurity solutions. PLDT also offers local exchange telephone services for Subic Bay Freeport, Clark Freeport Zone, Bonifacio Global City, and selected cities in Mindanao through its subsidiaries.

PLDT's retail fixed line services are branded under PLDT Home brand. It offers home broadband, IPTV, and triple play packages with devices from TP-Link and Roku.

Wireless

PLDT operates its wireless cellular services through its brands, namely Smart and TNT

Smart, its flagship brand, offers commercial wireless services through its 2G, 3G, 3.5G HSPA+, 4G LTE network, and 5G in the key areas in the Philippines. Smart also offers terrestrial satellite communication services and wireless complimentary offerings.

TNT provides a wide range of offerings in low-cost call, text, and mobile internet packages, as well as other value-added services.

Investments

PLDT currently invests in media through Pilipinas Global Network and MediaQuest Holdings, funded through its Beneficial Trust Fund. MediaQuest's assets include broadcasting firms TV5 Network and Nation Broadcasting Corporation, direct-to-home satellite operator Cignal TV, and major newspaper companies The Philippine Star and BusinessWorld, among others.

PLDT also has investments in energy utility (Meralco, through PLDT Communication and Energy Ventures), business jet transportation (Pacific Global One Aviation Company), and e-commerce and financial technology development (Voyager Innovations), among others.

Ownership
The company's ownership is divided among the public (41.55%), Philippine Telecommunications Investments Corporation (12.05%), Metro Pacific Resources, Inc. (9.98%); non-Philippine subsidiaries of First Pacific Company Limited (3.54%), NTT Communications Corp. (5.85%), NTT DoCoMo, Inc. (14.5%), and JG Summit Group (11.27%).

Criticisms

Bandwidth caps

In October 2015, PLDT introduced so-called "volume boosters" (instead of 30% bandwidth throttling in 2014 and 256kbit/s bandwidth throttling in 2015) when exceeding monthly 30GB to 70GB bandwidth cap for TD-LTE connection plans (Ultera). "In case your usage exceeds your monthly volume allowance, you can still enjoy the internet by purchasing additional volume boosters. Otherwise, connectivity will be halted until your monthly volume is refreshed on your next billing cycle." Globe followed the suit with a similar "volume boost" arrangement.

This practice has since been weaned off for fixed broadband such as DSL and fiber optic, particularly with capped rates being silently retired. Globe, who previously retired all their unlimited data rates to capped ones, have reintroduced uncapped rates too.

Lock-in period

In 2015, PLDT increased lock-in period for TD-LTE connection plans from 24 to 36 months (3 years) with the pre-termination fee equal to the full balance for the remaining period. After the lock-in period the contract is automatically renewed for another 36 months subject to the same terms and conditions. As of now the Globe lock-in period is still 2 years with no pre-termination fee outside of the lock-in period. The PLDT TD-LTE contract allows PLDT to change the terms and conditions at any time with the only way left for subscribers to opt out of the altered service through paying the full pre-termination fee: "8.3 Modification. SBI reserves the right at its discretion to modify, delete or add to any of the terms and conditions of this Agreement at any time without further notice. It is the Subscriber’s responsibility to regularly check any changes to these Terms and Conditions. The Subscriber’s continued use of the Service after any such changes constitutes acceptance of the new Terms and Conditions." Even as the Consumer Act of the Philippines states "Unfair or Unconscionable Sales Act or Practice ... the following circumstances shall be considered ... that the transaction that the seller or supplier induced the consumer to enter into was excessively one-sided in favor of the seller or supplier", the practice of inducing extremely long-term contracts with the ultimate pre-termination penalty has not been legally challenged yet.

Subsidiaries and affiliates

Sports teams
PLDT Home Fibr Hitters (men's team)
PLDT Home Fibr Hitters (women's team)

Esports
 Omega (esports), a professional esports team launched by PLDT and its mobile arm, Smart for Dota 2, Mobile Legends: Bang Bang, and Tekken 7

See also

 Internet in the Philippines
 List of companies of the Philippines
 Telecommunications in the Philippines

References

External links

Smart Communications

 
Companies based in Manila
Companies based in Makati
Telecommunications companies established in 1928
Companies listed on the Philippine Stock Exchange
Companies listed on the New York Stock Exchange
NTT Communications
NTT Docomo
Philippine companies established in 1928
Internet service providers of the Philippines